Castle Park is a sports stadium in Doncaster, South Yorkshire. It is the home of the Doncaster Knights, a Rugby Union side who play in the RFU Championship. Historically it was known as Armthorpe Road, but was renamed in 2000. Capacity is around 5,000. In 2008 the club opened the £3m all-seater De Mulder-Lloyd Stand with a capacity of 1,650.

References

External links
Castle Park Website

Rugby union stadiums in England
Sports venues in Doncaster